The River Ryburn is a river in West Yorkshire, England. It flows through the villages of Rishworth, Ripponden and Triangle before flowing into the River Calder at Sowerby Bridge.

Course
The river becomes known as Ryburn at the confluence of rag sapling Clough  and Black Castle Clough to the east of Blackstone Edge Reservoir. It flows east parallel to the A58 Rochdale Road into Baitings reservoir. It emerges from the east end of the reservoir for a short time before flowing into Ryburn Reservoir. The river flows out of the east end of the reservoir just to the north of the village of Rishworth, before turning north east and flowing through Ripponden. After leaving the town, it flows north to Triangle before turning north east again, flowing through Sowerby Bridge and joining the River Calder.

History
The bridge on the B6113, Elland Road, in Ripponden was once part of the Elland Turnpike in 1815. It was originally built in 1772 and widened and altered in the nineteenth century. Next to this bridge is the original Ripponden Old Bridge which has been around since at least 1313.

Baitings and Ryburn reservoirs were built for Wakefield Corporation. Baitings was opened on 14 November 1956 after eight years' work and a cost of £1.4 million. At low water levels, the old road and bridge become visible. Ryburn Reservoir was the first to be opened on 7 September 1933 after eight years' construction at a cost of £240,000.

Local landowner John Rawson (1813–1899) was responsible for the planting of much of the woodland along the River Ryburn valley.

Lists

Tributaries
 Knave Holes Clough
 Dry Clough
 White Hollow Clough
 Scar Clough
 Greenwood Clough
 Horse Hey Clough
 Clay Clough
 Hutch Brook
 Booth Wood Clough
 Old Eli Clough
 Highlee Clough
 Nether Ends Beck

Settlements
 Rishworth
 Ripponden
 Ripponden Wood
 Kebroyd
 Triangle
 Sowerby Bridge

Crossings
 Dhoul's Pavement
 Baitings Viaduct
 A672, Slitheroe Bridge, Ripponden
 B6113, Elland Road, Ripponden
 Old Ripponden Bridge
 Stansfield Bridge, Triangle
 Unnamed Road, Sowerby Bridge
 Watson Bridge, Sowerby Bridge
 Scar Head Road, Sowerby Bridge
 Victoria Road, Sowerby Bridge
 Station Road, Sowerby Bridge
 Northern Rail Leeds to Manchester Line

Gallery

Sources
 Ordnance Survey Open Viewer https://www.ordnancesurvey.co.uk/business-government/tools-support/open-data-support
 Google Earth
 National Environment Research Council - Centre for Ecology and Hydrology http://www.ceh.ac.uk/index.html
 Environment Agency http://www.environment-agency.gov.uk/

References

Rivers of Calderdale